Colorado State University Global (CSU Global) is an online public university that is a member of the Colorado State University System. Founded in 2007, CSU Global is headquartered in Aurora, Colorado. CSU Global offers online undergraduate and graduate degree and certificate programs. The university specializes in non-traditional, adult professional students and students who can't take part in a traditional campus setting.

History
CSU Global was established using a $12 million loan from the CSU Board of Governors, (which it has already paid back), on August 24, 2007, with a central goal of meeting the educational needs of adult learners in the State of Colorado and beyond by providing high quality online programs. It was originally named CSU-Colorado, but that name was replaced early on with its current title.

On May 7, 2008, the CSU System Board of Governors delegated authority to CSU Global to oversee academic, personnel, and financial matters consistent with powers granted to CSU and CSU Pueblo. CSU Global first opened in September 2008. CSU Global was legally sanctioned as a third, independent University on March 18, 2009, when Colorado’s Governor Ritter signed into law the State of Colorado Senate Bill 09-086 declaring the establishment of the CSU Global as an online university that is part of the Colorado State University System.

CSU Global defines itself as "the first statutorily-defined, non-profit, online state university" in the United States.

Degree completion programs
All CSU Global bachelor degrees are degree completion programs that are designed to provide learners the ability to combine college credit acquired from previously attended universities, life and work experience, CLEP and military credits to earn the rest of the credits needed to complete a college degree. These programs include 15 bachelor's degree programs and 30 bachelor's degree specializations.

Students are placed on one of two degree tracks, called the burgundy track and the gold track, dictating when classes start and are available. All courses, with a few exceptions, are eight weeks long and require the completion of a Portfolio Project.  In 2018, CSU Global transitioned from utilization of Schoology to Canvas as the primary learning management system.

Graduate programs
CSU Global offers 16 master's degree programs and 25 specializations for its master's programs.

Accreditation
On June 30, 2011, Colorado State University Global was officially granted independent regional accreditation status by the Higher Learning Commission, the regional accrediting body for the North Central Association of Colleges and Schools. CSU Global is the first public university in Colorado to receive initial HLC accreditation since 1971.

Administration
The Board of Governors presides over the Colorado State University System, which comprises Colorado State University, Colorado State University Pueblo, and Colorado State University Global.  The Board of Governors consists of nine voting members appointed by the Governor of Colorado and confirmed by the Colorado State Senate, and four elected non-voting members.  Voting members come from many fields, including agriculture, business, and public service.  A student and faculty representative from each university act as non-voting Board members. The board also appoints a Chancellor to oversee all university Presidents.

References

External links
Official website
Colorado State University System website

Colorado State University
Aurora, Colorado
2007 establishments in Colorado
Distance education institutions based in the United States
Educational institutions established in 2007